Lava is molten or partially molten rock (magma) that has been expelled from the interior of a terrestrial planet (such as Earth) or a moon onto its surface. The volcanic rock resulting from subsequent cooling is also often called lava.

A lava flow is an outpouring of lava during an effusive eruption. (An explosive eruption, by contrast, produces a mixture of volcanic ash and other fragments called tephra, not lava flows.) The viscosity of most lava is about that of ketchup, roughly 10,000 to 100,000 times that of water. Even so, lava can flow great distances before cooling causes it to solidify, because lava exposed to air quickly develops a solid crust that insulates the remaining liquid lava, helping to keep it hot and inviscid enough to continue flowing.

The word lava comes from Italian and is probably derived from the Latin word labes, which means a fall or slide. An early use of the word in connection with extrusion of magma from below the surface is found in a short account of the 1737 eruption of Vesuvius, written by Francesco Serao, who described "a flow of fiery lava" as an analogy to the flow of water and mud down the flanks of the volcano (a lahar) after heavy rain.

Properties of lava

Composition 

Solidified lava on the Earth's crust is predominantly silicate minerals: mostly feldspars, feldspathoids, olivine, pyroxenes, amphiboles, micas and quartz. Rare nonsilicate lavas can be formed by local melting of nonsilicate mineral deposits or by separation of a magma into immiscible silicate and nonsilicate liquid phases.

Silicate lavas 
Silicate lavas are molten mixtures dominated by oxygen and silicon, the most abundant elements of the Earth's crust, with smaller quantities of aluminium, calcium, magnesium, iron, sodium, and potassium and minor amounts of many other elements. Petrologists routinely express the composition of a silicate lava in terms of the weight or molar mass fraction of the oxides of the major elements (other than oxygen) present in the lava.

The physical behavior of silicate magmas is dominated by the silica component. Silicon ions in lava strongly bind to four oxygen ions in a tetrahedral arrangement. If an oxygen ion is bound to two silicon ions in the melt, it is described as a bridging oxygen, and lava with many clumps or chains of silicon ions connected by bridging oxygen ions is described as partially polymerized. Aluminium in combination with alkali metal oxides (sodium and potassium) also tends to polymerize the lava. Other cations, such as ferrous iron, calcium, and magnesium, bond much more weakly to oxygen and reduce the tendency to polymerize. Partial polymerization makes the lava viscous, so lava high in silica is much more viscous than lava low in silica.

Because of the role of silica in determining viscosity and because many other properties of a lava (such as its temperature) are observed to correlate with silica content, silicate lavas are divided into four chemical types based on silica content: felsic, intermediate, mafic, and ultramafic.

Felsic lava 
Felsic or silicic lavas have a silica content greater than 63%. They include rhyolite and dacite lavas. For comparison, water has a viscosity of about 1 cP (0.001 Pa⋅s). Because of this very high viscosity, felsic lavas usually erupt explosively to produce pyroclastic (fragmental) deposits. However, rhyolite lavas occasionally erupt effusively to form lava spines, lava domes or "coulees" (which are thick, short lava flows). The lavas typically fragment as they extrude, producing block lava flows. These often contain obsidian.

Unusually hot (>950 °C; >1,740 °F) rhyolite lavas, however, may flow for distances of many tens of kilometres, such as in the Snake River Plain of the northwestern United States.

Intermediate lava 
Intermediate or andesitic lavas contain 52% to 63% silica, and are lower in aluminium and usually somewhat richer in magnesium and iron than felsic lavas. Intermediate lavas form andesite domes and block lavas and may occur on steep composite volcanoes, such as in the Andes. This is slightly greater than the viscosity of smooth peanut butter. Intermediate lavas show a greater tendency to form phenocrysts. Higher iron and magnesium tends to manifest as a darker groundmass, including amphibole or pyroxene phenocrysts.

Mafic lava 
Mafic or basaltic lavas are typified by relatively high magnesium oxide and iron oxide content (whose molecular formulas provide the consonants in mafic) and have a silica content limited to a range 52% to 45%. This is similar to the viscosity of ketchup, although it is still many orders of magnitude higher than that of water. Mafic lavas tend to produce low-profile shield volcanoes or flood basalts, because the less viscous lava can flow for long distances from the vent. The thickness of a solidified basaltic lava flow, particularly on a low slope, may be much greater than the thickness of the moving molten lava flow at any one time, because basaltic lavas may "inflate" by a continued supply of lava and its pressure on a solidified crust. Most basaltic lavas are of ʻaʻā or pāhoehoe types, rather than block lavas. Underwater, they can form pillow lavas, which are rather similar to entrail-type pahoehoe lavas on land.

Ultramafic lava 
Ultramafic lavas, such as komatiite and highly magnesian magmas that form boninite, take the composition and temperatures of eruptions to the extreme. All have a silica content under 45%. At this temperature there is practically no polymerization of the mineral compounds, creating a highly mobile liquid. Viscosities of komatiite magmas are thought to have been as low as 100 to 1000 cP (0.1 to 1 Pa⋅s), similar to that of light motor oil. Most ultramafic lavas are no younger than the Proterozoic, with a few ultramafic magmas known from the Phanerozoic in Central America that are attributed to a hot mantle plume. No modern komatiite lavas are known, as the Earth's mantle has cooled too much to produce highly magnesian magmas.

Alkaline lavas 
Some silicate lavas have an elevated content of alkali metal oxides (sodium and potassium), particularly in regions of continental rifting, areas overlying deeply subducted plates, or at intraplate hotspots. Their silica content can range from ultramafic (nephelinites, basanites and tephrites) to felsic (trachytes). They are more likely to be generated at greater depths in the mantle than subalkaline magmas. Olivine nephelinite lavas are both ultramafic and highly alkaline, and are thought to have come from much deeper in the mantle of the Earth than other lavas.

Non-silicate lavas 

Some lavas of unusual composition have erupted onto the surface of the Earth. These include:
 Carbonatite and natrocarbonatite lavas are known from Ol Doinyo Lengai volcano in Tanzania, which is the sole example of an active carbonatite volcano. Carbonatites in the geologic record are typically 75% carbonate minerals, with lesser amounts of silica-undersaturated silicate minerals (such as micas and olivine), apatite, magnetite, and pyrochlore. This may not reflect the original composition of the lava, which may have included sodium carbonate that was subsequently removed by hydrothermal activity, though laboratory experiments show that a calcite-rich magma is possible. Carbonatite lavas show stable isotope ratios indicating they are derived from the highly alkaline silicic lavas with which they are always associated, probably by separation of an immiscible phase. Natrocarbonatite lavas of Ol Doinyo Lengai are composed mostly of sodium carbonate, with about half as much calcium carbonate and half again as much potassium carbonate, and minor amounts of halides, fluorides, and sulphates.
 Iron oxide lavas are thought to be the source of the iron ore at Kiruna, Sweden which formed during the Proterozoic. Iron oxide lavas of Pliocene age occur at the El Laco volcanic complex on the Chile-Argentina border. Iron oxide lavas are thought to be the result of immiscible separation of iron oxide magma from a parental magma of calc-alkaline or alkaline composition.

The term "lava" can also be used to refer to molten "ice mixtures" in eruptions on the icy satellites of the Solar System's gas giants.

Rheology 

The behavior of lava flows is mostly determined by the lava's viscosity. Lava viscosity is mostly determined by composition but also depends on temperature and shear rate.

Lava viscosity determines the kind of volcanic activity that takes place when the lava is erupted. The greater the viscosity, the greater the tendency for eruptions to be explosive rather than effusive. As a result, most lava flows on Earth, Mars, and Venus are composed of basalt lava. On Earth, 90% of lava flows are mafic or ultramafic, with intermediate lava making up 8% of flows and felsic lava making up just 2% of flows. Viscosity also determines the aspect (thickness relative to lateral extent) of flows, the speed with which flows move, and the surface character of the flows.

When highly viscous lavas erupt effusively rather than their more common explosive form, they almost always erupt as high-aspect flows or domes. These flows take the form of block lava rather than ʻaʻā or pāhoehoe. Obsidian flows are common. Intermediate lavas tend to form steep stratovolcanoes, with alternating beds of lava from effusive eruptions and tephra from explosive eruptions. Mafic lavas form relatively thin flows that can move great distances, forming shield volcanoes with gentle slopes.

In addition to melted rock, most lavas contain solid crystals of various minerals, fragments of exotic rocks known as xenoliths, and fragments of previously solidified lava. The crystal content of most lavas gives them thixotropic and shear thinning properties. In other words, most lavas do not behave like Newtonian fluids, in which the rate of flow is proportional to the shear stress. Instead, a typical lava is a Bingham fluid, which shows considerable resistance to flow until a stress threshold, called the yield stress, is crossed. This results in plug flow of partially crystalline lava. A familiar example of plug flow is toothpaste squeezed out of a toothpaste tube. The toothpaste comes out as a semisolid plug, because shear is concentrated in a thin layer in the toothpaste next to the tube and only there does the toothpaste behave as a fluid. Thixotropic behavior also hinders crystals from settling out of the lava. Once the crystal content reaches about 60%, the lava ceases to behave like a fluid and begins to behave like a solid. Such a mixture of crystals with melted rock is sometimes described as crystal mush.

Lava flow speeds vary based primarily on viscosity and slope. The scaling relationship for lavas is that the average speed of a flow scales as the square of its thickness divided by its viscosity. This implies that a rhyolite flow would have to be about a thousand times thicker than a basalt flow to flow at a similar speed.

Temperature

This temperature range is similar to the hottest temperatures achievable with a forced air charcoal forge. Lava is most fluid when first erupted, becoming much more viscous as its temperature drops.

Lava flows quickly develop an insulating crust of solid rock as a result of radiative loss of heat. Thereafter the lava cools by very slow conduction of heat through the rocky crust. For instance, geologists of the United States Geological Survey regularly drilled into the Kilauea Iki lava lake, formed in an eruption in 1959. Residual liquid was still present at depths of around  nineteen years after the eruption.

A cooling lava flow shrinks, and this fractures the flow. Basalt flows show a characteristic pattern of fractures. The uppermost parts of the flow show irregular downward-splaying fractures, while the lower part of the flow shows a very regular pattern of fractures that break the flow into five- or six-sided columns. The irregular upper part of the solidified flow is called the entablature, while the lower part that shows columnar jointing is called the colonnade. (The terms are borrowed from Greek temple architecture.) Likewise, regular vertical patterns on the sides of columns, produced by cooling with periodic fracturing, are described as chisel marks. Despite their names, these are natural features produced by cooling, thermal contraction, and fracturing.

As lava cools, crystallizing inwards from its edges, it expels gases to form vesicles at the lower and upper boundaries. These are described as pipe-stem vesicles or pipe-stem amygdales. Liquids expelled from the cooling crystal mush rise upwards into the still-fluid center of the cooling flow and produce vertical vesicle cylinders. Where these merge towards the top of the flow, they form sheets of vesicular basalt and are sometimes capped with gas cavities that sometimes fill with secondary minerals. The beautiful amethyst geodes found in the flood basalts of South America formed in this manner.

Flood basalts typically crystallize little before they cease flowing, and, as a result, flow textures are uncommon in less silicic flows. On the other hand, flow banding is common in felsic flows.

Lava morphology

The morphology of lava describes its surface form or texture. More fluid basaltic lava flows tend to form flat sheet-like bodies, whereas viscous rhyolite lava flows form knobbly, blocky masses of rock. Lava erupted underwater has its own distinctive characteristics.

ʻAʻā 

Aā (also spelled aa, aa, aa, and a-aa, and pronounced  or ) is one of three basic types of flow lava. Aā is basaltic lava characterized by a rough or rubbly surface composed of broken lava blocks called clinker. The word is  Hawaiian meaning "stony rough lava", but also to "burn" or "blaze"; it was introduced as a technical term in geology by Clarence Dutton.

The loose, broken, and sharp, spiny surface of an aā flow makes hiking difficult and slow. The clinkery surface actually covers a massive dense core, which is the most active part of the flow. As pasty lava in the core travels downslope, the clinkers are carried along at the surface. At the leading edge of an aā flow, however, these cooled fragments tumble down the steep front and are buried by the advancing flow. This produces a layer of lava fragments both at the bottom and top of an aā flow.

Aā is usually of higher viscosity than pāhoehoe. Pāhoehoe can turn into aā if it becomes turbulent from meeting impediments or steep slopes.

The sharp, angled texture makes aā a strong radar reflector, and can easily be seen from an orbiting satellite (bright on Magellan pictures).

Pāhoehoe

Pāhoehoe (also spelled pahoehoe, from Hawaiian  meaning "smooth, unbroken lava") is basaltic lava that has a smooth, billowy, undulating, or ropy surface. These surface features are due to the movement of very fluid lava under a congealing surface crust. The Hawaiian word was introduced as a technical term in geology by Clarence Dutton.

A pāhoehoe flow typically advances as a series of small lobes and toes that continually break out from a cooled crust. It also forms lava tubes where the minimal heat loss maintains low viscosity. The surface texture of pāhoehoe flows varies widely, displaying all kinds of bizarre shapes often referred to as lava sculpture. With increasing distance from the source, pāhoehoe flows may change into aā flows in response to heat loss and consequent increase in viscosity.

Some flood basalt flows in the geologic record extend for hundreds of kilometres.

The rounded texture makes pāhoehoe a poor radar reflector, and is difficult to see from an orbiting satellite (dark on Magellan picture).

Block lava flows 

Block lava flows are typical of andesitic lavas from stratovolcanoes. They behave in a similar manner to ʻaʻā flows but their more viscous nature causes the surface to be covered in smooth-sided angular fragments (blocks) of solidified lava instead of clinkers. As with ʻaʻā flows, the molten interior of the flow, which is kept insulated by the solidified blocky surface, advances over the rubble that falls off the flow front. They also move much more slowly downhill and are thicker in depth than ʻaʻā flows.

Pillow lava

Pillow lava is the lava structure typically formed when lava emerges from an underwater volcanic vent or subglacial volcano or a lava flow enters the ocean. The viscous lava gains a solid crust on contact with the water, and this crust cracks and oozes additional large blobs or "pillows" as more lava emerges from the advancing flow. Since water covers the majority of Earth's surface and most volcanoes are situated near or under bodies of water, pillow lava is very common.

Lava landforms 
Because it is formed from viscous molten rock, lava flows and eruptions create distinctive formations, landforms and topographical features from the macroscopic to the microscopic.

Volcanoes

Volcanoes are the primary landforms built by repeated eruptions of lava and ash over time. They range in shape from shield volcanoes with broad, shallow slopes formed from predominantly effusive eruptions of relatively fluid basaltic lava flows, to steeply-sided stratovolcanoes (also known as composite volcanoes) made of alternating layers of ash and more viscous lava flows typical of intermediate and felsic lavas.

A caldera, which is a large subsidence crater, can form in a stratovolcano, if the magma chamber is partially or wholly emptied by large explosive eruptions; the summit cone no longer supports itself and thus collapses in on itself afterwards. Such features may include volcanic crater lakes and lava domes after the event. However, calderas can also form by non-explosive means such as gradual magma subsidence. This is typical of many shield volcanoes.

Cinder and spatter cones

Cinder cones and spatter cones are small-scale features formed by lava accumulation around a small vent on a volcanic edifice. Cinder cones are formed from tephra or ash and tuff which is thrown from an explosive vent. Spatter cones are formed by accumulation of molten volcanic slag and cinders ejected in a more liquid form.

Kīpukas

Another Hawaiian English term derived from the Hawaiian language, a kīpuka denotes an elevated area such as a hill, ridge or old lava dome inside or downslope from an area of active volcanism. New lava flows will cover the surrounding land, isolating the kīpuka so that it appears as a (usually) forested island in a barren lava flow.

Lava domes and coulées

Lava domes are formed by the extrusion of viscous felsic magma. They can form prominent rounded protuberances, such as at Valles Caldera. As a volcano extrudes silicic lava, it can form an inflation dome or endogenous dome, gradually building up a large, pillow-like structure which cracks, fissures, and may release cooled chunks of rock and rubble. The top and side margins of an inflating lava dome tend to be covered in fragments of rock, breccia and ash.

Examples of lava dome eruptions include the Novarupta dome, and successive lava domes of Mount St Helens.

When a dome forms on an inclined surface it can flow in short thick flows called coulées (dome flows). These flows often travel only a few kilometres from the vent.

Lava tubes

Lava tubes are formed when a flow of relatively fluid lava cools on the upper surface sufficiently to form a crust. Beneath this crust, which being made of rock is an excellent insulator, the lava can continue to flow as a liquid. When this flow occurs over a prolonged period of time the lava conduit can form a tunnel-like aperture or lava tube, which can conduct molten rock many kilometres from the vent without cooling appreciably. Often these lava tubes drain out once the supply of fresh lava has stopped, leaving a considerable length of open tunnel within the lava flow.

Lava lakes

Rarely, a volcanic cone may fill with lava but not erupt. Lava which pools within the caldera is known as a lava lake. Lava lakes do not usually persist for long, either draining back into the magma chamber once pressure is relieved (usually by venting of gases through the caldera), or by draining via eruption of lava flows or pyroclastic explosion.

There are only a few sites in the world where permanent lakes of lava exist. These include:
 Mount Erebus, Antarctica
 Erta Ale, Ethiopia
 Nyiragongo, Democratic Republic of Congo
 Ambrym, Vanuatu.

Lava delta

Lava deltas form wherever sub-aerial flows of lava enter standing bodies of water. The lava cools and breaks up as it encounters the water, with the resulting fragments filling in the seabed topography such that the sub-aerial flow can move further offshore. Lava deltas are generally associated with large-scale, effusive type basaltic volcanism.

Lava fountains 

A lava fountain is a volcanic phenomenon in which lava is forcefully but non-explosively ejected from a crater, vent, or fissure. Lava fountains may occur as a series of short pulses, or a continuous jet of lava. They are commonly associated with Hawaiian eruptions.

Hazards

Lava flows are enormously destructive to property in their path. However, casualties are rare since flows are usually slow enough for people and animals to escape, though this is dependent on the viscosity of the lava. Nevertheless, injuries and deaths have occurred, either because they had their escape route cut off, because they got too close to the flow or, more rarely, if the lava flow front travels too quickly. This notably happened during the eruption of Nyiragongo in Zaire (now Democratic Republic of the Congo). On the night of 10 January 1977 a crater wall was breached and a fluid lava lake drained out in under an hour. As a result of this disaster, the mountain was designated a Decade Volcano in 1991.

Deaths attributed to volcanoes frequently have a different cause, for example volcanic ejecta, pyroclastic flow from a collapsing lava dome, lahars, poisonous gases that travel ahead of lava, or explosions caused when the flow comes into contact with water. A particularly dangerous area is called a lava bench. This very young ground will typically break off and fall into the sea.

Areas of recent lava flows continue to represent a hazard long after the lava has cooled. Where young flows have created new lands, land is more unstable and can break off into the sea. Flows often crack deeply, forming dangerous chasms, and a fall against ʻaʻā lava is similar to falling against broken glass. Rugged hiking boots, long pants, and gloves are recommended when crossing lava flows.

Diverting a lava flow is extremely difficult, but it can be accomplished in some circumstances, as was once partially achieved in Vestmannaeyjar, Iceland. The optimal design of simple, low-cost barriers that divert lava flows is an area of ongoing research.

Towns destroyed by lava flows

 The Nisga'a villages of Lax Ksiluux and Wii Lax K'abit in northwestern British Columbia, Canada, were destroyed by thick lava flows during the eruption of Tseax Cone in the 1700s.
 Garachico on the island of Tenerife was destroyed by the eruption of Trevejo (1706) (rebuilt).
 Cagsawa, Philippines, buried by lava erupted from Mayon Volcano in 1814
 Keawaiki, Hawaii, 1859 (abandoned)
 San Sebastiano al Vesuvio, Italy, destroyed in 1944 by the most recent eruption of Mount Vesuvius during the Allies' occupation of southern Italy (rebuilt)
 Koae and Kapoho, Hawaii, were both destroyed by the same eruption of Kīlauea in January, 1960 (abandoned).
 Kalapana, Hawaii, was destroyed by the eruption of the Kīlauea volcano in 1990 (abandoned).
 Kapoho, Hawaii, was largely inundated by lava in June 2018, with its subdivision Vacationland Hawaii being completely destroyed.

Towns damaged by lava flows
 Catania, Italy, in the 1669 Etna eruption (rebuilt)
 Sale'aula, Samoa, by eruptions of Mt Matavanu between 1905 and 1911
 Mascali, Italy, almost completely destroyed by the eruption of Mount Etna in 1928 (rebuilt)
 Parícutin (village after which the volcano was named) and San Juan Parangaricutiro, Mexico, by Parícutin from 1943 to 1952
 Heimaey, Iceland, in the 1973 Eldfell eruption (rebuilt)
 Piton Sainte-Rose, Reunion island, in 1977
 Royal Gardens, Hawaii, by the eruption of Kilauea in 1986–87 (abandoned)
 Goma, Democratic Republic of Congo, in the eruption of Nyiragongo in 2002
 Los Llanos de Aridane (Todoque neighbourhood) and El Paso (El Paraíso neighbourhood) on La Palma in the 2021 Cumbre Vieja volcanic eruption

Towns destroyed by tephra
Tephra is lava in the form of volcanic ash, lapilli, volcanic bombs or volcanic blocks.
 Pompeii, Italy, in the eruption of Mount Vesuvius in 79 AD
 Herculaneum, Italy, in the eruption of Mount Vesuvius in 79 AD
 Cerén, El Salvador, in the eruption of Ilopango between 410 and 535 AD
 Sumbawa Island, Indonesia, in the eruption of Mount Tambora in 1815
 Plymouth, Montserrat, in 1995. Plymouth was the capital and only port of entry for Montserrat and had to be completely abandoned, along with over half of the island. It is still the de jure capital.

See also

References

External links
 

 USGS definition of Aā
 USGS definition of Pāhoehoe
 USGS definition of Ropy Pāhoehoe
 Volcanic landforms of Hawaii
 USGS hazards associated with lava flows
 Hawaiian Volcano Observatory Volcano Watch newsletter article on Nyiragongo eruptions, 31 January 2002
 National Geographic lava video  Retrieved 23 August 2007

Glassforming liquids and melts
Igneous rocks
Volcanism
Eruption products
Volcanic degassing